Our Land, whose complete name is Our Land – Italians with Giorgia Meloni, is a conservative political committee led by Giorgia Meloni, leader also of Brothers of Italy (FdI). Practically speaking, Our Land is a parallel organisation to FdI and aims at enlarging FdI's popular base.

Leading figures involved in Our Land include Alberto Giorgetti (a deputy of Forza Italia, who was long a member of National Alliance), Giuseppe Cossiga (a former deputy of Forza Italia and founding member of FdI) and Walter Rizzetto (a former deputy of the Five Star Movement and Free Alternative).

References

External links
Official website

National conservatism
2015 establishments in Italy
Giorgia Meloni